State Road 370 (NM 370) is a  state highway in the US state of New Mexico. NM 370's southern terminus is at U.S. Route 64 (US 64) and US 87 north of Clayton, and the northern terminus is at NM 456 east of Folsom.

Major intersections

See also

References

370
Transportation in Union County, New Mexico